Bougainvillia is a genus of hydroids in the family Bougainvilliidae in the class Hydrazoa. Members of the genus are characterised by having the marginal tentacles of their medusae arranged in four bundles. Some species are solitary and others are colonial but all are filter feeders. They are found in the Southern Ocean, having a circumpolar distribution, but some species also occur in the Northern Hemisphere, possibly travelling there as polyps on the hulls of ships.

Species
The World Register of Marine Species lists the following species:

Bougainvillia aberrans Calder, 1993
Bougainvillia aurantiaca Bouillon, 1980
Bougainvillia balei Stechow, 1924
Bougainvillia bitentaculata Uchida, 1925
Bougainvillia bougainvillei (Brandt, 1835)
Bougainvillia britannica (Forbes, 1841)
Bougainvillia carolinensis (Mccrady, 1859)
Bougainvillia chenyapingii Xu, Huang & Guo, 2007
Bougainvillia crassa Fraser, 1938
Bougainvillia dimorpha Schuchert, 1996
Bougainvillia frondosa Mayer, 1900
Bougainvillia fulva Agassiz & Mayer, 1899
Bougainvillia inaequalis Fraser, 1944
Bougainvillia involuta Uchida, 1947
Bougainvillia lamellata Xu, Huang & Liu, 2007
Bougainvillia longicirra Stechow, 1914
Bougainvillia longistyla Xu & Huang, 2004
Bougainvillia macloviana Lesson, 1836
Bougainvillia meinertiae Jäderholm, 1923
Bougainvillia multitentaculata Förster, 1923
Bougainvillia muscoides (Sars, 1846)
Bougainvillia muscus (Allman, 1863)
Bougainvillia niobe Mayer, 1894
Bougainvillia paraplatygaster Xu, Huang & Chen, 1991
Bougainvillia platygaster (Haeckel, 1879)
Bougainvillia principis (Steenstrup, 1850)
Bougainvillia pyramidata (Forbes & Goodsir, 1853)
Bougainvillia reticulata Xu & Huang, 2006
Bougainvillia rugosa Clarke, 1882
Bougainvillia superciliaris (L. Agassiz, 1849)
Bougainvillia vervoorti Bouillon, 1995

References

Bougainvilliidae
Hydrozoan genera